The Lumières Award for Best Film is an annual award presented by the Académie des Lumières since 1996.

Winners and nominees
In the following lists, the titles and names in bold with a blue background are the winners and recipients respectively; those not in bold are the nominees.

1990s

2000s

2010s

2020s

See also
César Award for Best Film
Louis Delluc Prize for Best Film
Prix du Syndicat Français de la Critique de Cinéma — Best French Film

External links 
 Lumières Award for Best Film at AlloCiné

Film
 
Awards for best film